Obuohia is a village in Ibere, Ikwuano Local Government Area of Abia State, Nigeria. Obuohia is the largest village of the Ibere clan and third largest in Ikwuano. It is part of the Obi Ibere Autonomous Community and doubles as the capital. Obuohia is 27km east of Umuahia, Abia State's capital.

History
Obuohia is believed to be derived syntactically from the words Obu (lodge), Ohia (literally means bush but in this context, Ohia is a name of a person). Oral stories has it that the first man to settle in Obuohia is Ohia, in whom is the reason its named Ohia's lodge; Obuohia.

Culture
The community is richly surrounded with numerous cultural displays like the colourful Ekpe and Iri Ji (New Yam) festivals.

Kindreds
Obuohia Ibere is made up of four kindreds which include;

• Umuakoo

• Umuachi

• Umuotuu 

• Umuodoro

People
The people of Obuohia are predominantly farmers, hunters and business merchants. Samuel Onuigbo, who happens to be the member representing Ikwuano/Umuahia North and South Constituency at the House of Representatives and Uche Mpamah (late), an ex-Commissioner of Sports for Abia State and former LGA Chairman of Ikwuano are from Obuohia.

Economy
The community members are heavily farmers which makes them a food zone of Ibere. Being over a 100 year old community with over 4,000 inhabitants, its citizens dwell mostly on diverse agricultural plantations which is the major source of income for their livelihood. They accommodate many labourers from neighbouring states like Nkalu in Akwa Ibom, Enugu and Ebonyi States. Their farm products are sold in the markets of Ndoro, Ariam and up to Umuahia. The community observes rest from its farming activities on Orie Ukwu market day which happens to be the market day of Obuohia but the market just like most markets in Ikwuano is no longer functional due to preference of the aforementioned markets. However, a new market was recently constructed.

See also
 Elemaga
 Ibere
 Ndoro

References

Populated places in Abia State